The 1869 Brecon by-election was fought on 24 April 1869.  The by-election was fought due to the voiding of the election of the incumbent MP of the Conservative Party, Howel Gwyn.  It was won by the Liberal candidate Edward Villiers.

References

1869 in Wales
1860s elections in Wales
History of Powys
Brecknockshire
1869 elections in the United Kingdom
By-elections to the Parliament of the United Kingdom in Welsh constituencies